Castle Craig may be:

Castle Craig, Connecticut, USA
Castlecraig, Black Isle, Scotland
Castle Craig Hospital, Scottish Borders
Castle Craig Rock, Waikato, New Zealand